Philip II, Count of Nassau-Saarbrücken (25 July 1509 – 19 June 1554) was a German nobleman.

He was born in Saarbrücken, the eldest son of John Louis and his second wife, Catherine of Moers.

In 1537, he married Catherine of Leiningen-Hartenburg (d. 1585).  This marriage remained childless.

In 1545, he succeeded his father as Count of Nassau-Saarbrücken.

He died childless, in Strasbourg, on 19 June 1554, aged 44, and was succeeded by his younger brother John III.

House of Nassau
Counts of Nassau-Saarbrücken
1509 births
1554 deaths
16th-century German people
People from Saarbrücken
Burials at Stiftskirche Sankt Arnual (Saarbrücken)